Charles Kuentz (June 19, 1895 in New York City – May 27, 1978 in Cairo) was an American–born French Egyptologist who was director of the Institut français d'archéologie orientale from 1940 to 1953. He married Jeanne Arcache, an Alexandria-based Lebanese poet and novelist in 1945.

References

French archaeologists
French Egyptologists
1895 births
1978 deaths
20th-century archaeologists
French expatriates in the United States
French expatriates in Egypt